Węgielnia  is a village in the administrative district of Gmina Miedzichowo, within Nowy Tomyśl County, Greater Poland Voivodeship, in west-central Poland.

References

Villages in Nowy Tomyśl County